Sanderson House is a Ward Wellington Ward-designed house in Syracuse, New York designed in the British Regency architectural style and built in 1922.  The house is listed on the National Register of Historic Places.  It was listed for its architecture.

The house was built for Amon F. Sanderson, an officer of the Scottholm Company which developed the Scottholm Tract in 1911.  Sanderson also commissioned, for his own residence, Sanderson House at 112 Scottholm Terrace.  It is located in the Scottholm Tract Historic District.

References

Houses in Syracuse, New York
National Register of Historic Places in Syracuse, New York
Houses on the National Register of Historic Places in New York (state)
Individually listed contributing properties to historic districts on the National Register in New York (state)
Houses completed in 1922